Emmanuel Roblès (4 May 1914 in Oran, French Algeria – 22 February 1995 in Boulogne, Hauts-de-Seine) was a French author. He was elected a member of the Académie Goncourt in 1973. He was one of many influential "pied-noir" of his time. The literary award Prix Emmanuel Roblès  has been established in his honour in 1990.

Selected bibliography
La Vallée du paradis (1940)
Travail d'homme (1942)
La Marie des quatres vents (1942), short story
Nuits sur le monde (1944), short stories
L'Action (1946)
Les Hauteurs de la ville (1948), winner of the Prix Femina
Montserrat (1948), play
La Mort en face (1951), short stories
Cela s'appelle l'aurore (1952)
Federica (1954)
Les Couteaux (1956), novel about Mexico
L'Homme d'Avril (1959), short stories (title story about Japan)
Le Vésuve (1961)
Jeunes saisons (1961), autobiography
La Remontée du fleuve (1962)
La Croisière (1968)
Un Printemps d'Italie (1970)
L'Ombre et la rive (1972), short stories
Saison violente (1974)
Un Amour sans fin (1976)
Les Sirènes (1977)
L'Arbre invisible (1979)
Venise en hiver (1981)
La chasse à la licorne (1985)
Norma, ou, L'Exil infini (1988)
Albert Camus et la trêve civile (1988), criticism
Les Rives du fleuve bleu (1990), short stories
Cristal des jours (1990), poetry
L'Herbe des ruines (1992)
Erica (1994), short stories
Camus, frère de soleil (1995), biography

External links
Biography

1914 births
1995 deaths
People from Oran
Pieds-Noirs
French biographers
Prix Femina winners
20th-century French novelists
20th-century French poets
20th-century biographers
French male poets
French male novelists
French male short story writers
French short story writers
20th-century short story writers
Winners of the Prix Broquette-Gonin (literature)
20th-century French male writers
French male non-fiction writers
Male biographers